Timoteo Domínguez Island is an Uruguayan island off the Río de la Plata coast of Uruguay.

The Argentine exclave Martín García island is within the boundaries of Uruguayan waters; in 1973 both countries reached an agreement establishing Martín García as an Argentine territory and also as a nature reserve. In recent decades, river sediments gave birth to the very first dry limit between Argentina and Uruguay: the islands Martín García and Timoteo Domínguez are united.

References

River islands of Uruguay
Islands of the Río de la Plata
Argentina–Uruguay border